Hideki Kato, better known under the stage name Crack Fierce, is a Japanese noise musician. He started Crack Fierce in the spring of 1996, and also runs the label United Syndicate. He has also built effects units.

Note: He is not the same as Kato Hideki, who plays bass in Ground Zero.

Discography

As Crack Fierce
Vagina Starving (1996 United Syndicate)
Smack My Crack (199? Self Abuse)
Felony Noise (1997 Lazy Squid)
Illegal Collage & Feedback (1998 Robotomy)
Full Metal Confused (1998 Solipsism)
Perspicacious Variance (1999 Spite)
Red Flag (2008 Noise Ninja)
Heterogenious Infusion (split with Mlehst) (1997 United Syndicate)
"Pain Circulation" (split with Kazumoto Endo) (1997 United Syndicate)
"Crowded Noise" (split with Armenia) (1997 Bizarre Audio Arts / United Syndicate)
untitled (split with Third Organ) (1999 United Syndicate)

As C-Fat
with Two Assistant Deputy Ministers
untitled (2004 United Syndicate)
Kennel Club (2004 United Syndicate)

As Flip Flop
Interior A Priori Estimate (200? United Syndicate)

As Melting Plastic Head Core
with Mo*Te
My Sweet Memory (1998 Uncut)

References

External links

Noise musicians